Bishop Ivo Gugić (2 March 1920 – 3 June 1996) was a Roman Catholic prelate from Croatia, who served as the Diocesan Bishop of Kotor in Montenegro.

Life
He was born on 2 March 1920 in the small town of Vela Luka on the island of Korčula in the Kingdom of Serbs, Croats and Slovenes.  Beginning in 1983, he began serving the Church and the people of Montenegro as a bishop in the Diocese of Kotor. In 1996, he ended thirteen years of service as a bishop. (He was succeeded by bishop Ilija Janjić.) However, he continued to work with the Montenegrin government through the committee for the protection of minority and ethnic group rights. He was murdered in the same year in which he retired as a bishop; he died on June 3, 1996 in Kotor.

External links
 http://www.ika.hr/index.php?prikaz=vijest&ID=12297

1920 births
1996 deaths
People from Vela Luka
Croats of Montenegro
Roman Catholic bishops of Kotor
Bishops appointed by Pope John Paul II
20th-century Roman Catholic bishops in Montenegro
Roman Catholic bishops in Yugoslavia